The Versailles and Midway Railway was a 19th-century railway company in the U.S. state of Kentucky. It operated from 1884 until 1889, when it was incorporated into the Louisville Southern Railroad. It later made up part of the Southern Railway and its former rights-of-way currently form parts of the class-I Norfolk Southern system.

See also
 List of Kentucky railroads

Defunct Kentucky railroads
Defunct companies based in Kentucky